Nactus eboracensis is a species of lizard in the family Gekkonidae. It is endemic to Queensland in Australia and some Torres Strait Islands.

References

Nactus
Geckos of Australia
Reptiles described in 1877